is a South Korean football player, who played for SC Sagamihara as a forward.

Career
After growing in Yokohama F. Marinos youth ranks, Daimu was raised in a JFA Academy from 2006 to 2011. Then he signed with Fagiano Okayama, but he never had the chance of playing in J2, so he was sent for four seasons to their reserve team, which was in JFL. In January 2016, he decided to move to Blaublitz Akita.

Club statistics
Updated to 2 January 2022.

References

External links

Profile at Blaublitz Akita

1993 births
Living people
Association football people from Kanagawa Prefecture
Japanese footballers
J2 League players
J3 League players
Fagiano Okayama players
Blaublitz Akita players
SC Sagamihara players
Association football forwards